Ridgeway is a suburb of Johannesburg, South Africa.  It is located in Region F of the City of Johannesburg Metropolitan Municipality.

History
The suburb is situated on an old farm of Kroonheuwel. It had several names over the years such as Greenfields Park, Ridgebourne (after owners JM Beveridge and R Osbourne) before obtaining its current name in 1959.

Religion
Ridgeway has a growing Muslim population due to a mosque that was built in 2008.

References

Johannesburg Region F